The World Group was the highest level of Davis Cup competition in 2005. The first-round losers went into the Davis Cup World Group Play-offs, and the winners progress to the quarterfinals. The quarterfinalists were guaranteed a World Group spot for 2006.

On February 13, 2006 the International Tennis Federation (ITF) announced that Karol Beck had tested positive for the beta agonist clenbuterol during the semifinal for Slovakia against Argentina. As a consequence, the ITF suspended him from the game for two years.

Participating Teams

Draw

First round

Slovakia vs. Spain

Switzerland vs. Netherlands

Australia vs. Austria

Argentina vs. Czech Republic

Russia vs. Chile

France vs. Sweden

Romania vs. Belarus

United States vs. Croatia

Quarterfinals

Slovakia vs. Netherlands

Australia vs. Argentina

Russia vs. France

Croatia vs. Romania

Semifinals

Slovakia vs. Argentina

Croatia vs. Russia

Final

Slovakia vs. Croatia

References

World Group
Davis Cup World Group